Line 12 of the Beijing Subway is rapid transit line under construction in Beijing. It is fully underground. The line between Sijiqing and Dongfeng will be opened in 2023, due to planning adjustments east of Dongfeng.

Stations

Rolling stock

The line will use 8-car Type A rolling stock.

History
Line 12's route has undergone substantial changes on the planners' drawing board.
In the late 1990s, one draft of the subway plan showed Line 12 running from the Beijing South railway station to Huangcun. The Beijing South railway station was then built with subway platforms for only Lines 4 and 14. The old plan of Line 12 is cancelled now.

A new plan of Line 12 was announced at January 2012. In June 2012, there were several media reports listing the planned stations of the line. The final planning of the line started from Sijiqing in Haidian District east to Guanzhuangluxikou in Chaoyang District, following the northern Third Ring Road. The entire line has 21 stations, of which 15 will have transfers with other lines. The line will provide relief for the northern arc of the congested Line 10 loop line.

References

Beijing Subway lines
Proposed public transport in China
Proposed buildings and structures in Beijing
Transport infrastructure under construction in China